Alfred Roberts  (18 April 1892 – 10 February 1970) was an English grocer, preacher, and local politician. He served as alderman of Grantham from 1943 to 1952 and mayor of Grantham from 1945 to 1946. His second daughter, Margaret, was the first female prime minister of the United Kingdom.

Early life 
Roberts was born in Ringstead, Northamptonshire. He was the fifth of seven children. His father was Benjamin Ebenezer Roberts (28 December 1857 – 17 September 1925), from a Ringstead family, and his mother was Ellen Smith (20 November 1857 – 1 May 1935), whose own mother, Catherine Sullivan, was born at Kenmare in Ireland. Ellen's eldest two known siblings were also born in Ireland and her twin brothers in England in 1852. The gap in age between Alfred's aunt Mary and his uncles of around nine years coincides with the Great Famine. It more than likely meant that other siblings perished through starvation or associated diseases. His grandparents possibly left Kenmare in 1849–51, and two million more came destitute to England. This and the family's hard times may have much to do with the reluctance to acknowledge his being part Irish to his daughters.

Roberts's bad eyesight meant he could not enter the family trade of shoemaking. He left school at thirteen to help support his family and is listed in the 1911 census as living as a boarder in Oundle, Northamptonshire, and working as a grocer's assistant. He later moved to Grantham in Lincolnshire, where he gained a job as an apprentice in a greengrocers; he had initially wanted to become a teacher. When the First World War broke out in 1914, Roberts, "a deeply patriotic man", applied to enlist in the British Army six times but was rejected because of his weak eyesight.

Four years after moving to Grantham, Roberts met Beatrice Ethel Stephenson (24 August 1888 – 7 December 1960) through the Finkin Street Methodist Church, which he attended every Sunday. They married in Grantham on 28 May 1917. They had two daughters, both born in Grantham: Muriel Cullen (24 May 1921 – 3 December 2004) and Margaret Hilda (13 October 1925 – 8 April 2013). In 1919, they bought the grocery shop, and in 1923, Roberts opened a second shop.

Politics 
Roberts was an "old-fashioned liberal" who believed strongly in individual responsibility and sound finance. He had read and admired Stuart Mill's On Liberty. He came from a family that traditionally voted Liberal. Still, he believed that the Liberals had embraced collectivism and that the Conservatives stood for the old liberalism. His daughter Muriel recalled that Roberts "was always a Liberal at heart". In the 1935 general election, Roberts helped the local Conservative candidate Victor Warrender to win the Grantham constituency.

In 1927 Roberts was elected to the Grantham town council as an independent. He was also a part-time Justice of the Peace, president of the Chamber of Trade, President of Rotary, director of the Grantham Building Society and the Trustee Savings Bank, chairman of the local National Savings Movement, a governor of the local boys' and girls' grammar schools and chairman of the Workers' Educational Association. During the Second World War, he was Chief Welfare Officer, directing civil defence. He soon became Chairman of the Finance and Rating Committee and, in 1943, was elected by the council as Alderman; he served as Mayor of Grantham from November 1945 to 1946, in which he presided over the town's victory celebrations. In his inaugural speech, Roberts called for an extensive programme of expenditure to rebuild the roads, public transport, health and social services for children and to "build houses by the thousand".

On 21 May 1952, Roberts was voted out as Alderman by the first Labour majority on the council, and after the vote was taken, he proclaimed: "It is now almost nine years since I took up these robes in honour, and now I trust in honour they are laid down."  When his daughter Margaret recalled this event, over thirty years later as Prime Minister during an interview with Miriam Stoppard, she said that it was "very emotional" and wept on television.

Personal life 
Roberts retired and sold his business in 1958 but continued after that to preach and remained active in the Rotary Club. Beatrice died in 1960. 

On 26 November 1965, Roberts married again; his second wife was Cissie Miriam Hubbard, born 16 March 1896 in Long Bennington, Lincolnshire.

Roberts died on 10 February 1970, four months before the general election at which Edward Heath became Prime Minister. Shortly after this victory, Heath appointed Margaret to the cabinet, beginning her ministerial path to the top of government in 1979.

In 1997, the satirical magazine Punch published an article by Professor Bernard Crick featuring allegations, including one from an alleged victim, that Roberts had been involved in several sexual assaults on women. Crick had tried to put the allegations into the public domain before both the 1987 and 1997 elections but had been rebuffed by various publications. The article claimed that Roberts was an inspiration for a lecherous character who was a local councillor and grocer in the 1937 satire of Grantham, Rotten Borough. John Campbell, the biographer of his daughter Margaret Thatcher, believes that these allegations were unsubstantiated and dismissed by people who knew him and that the character in Rotten Borough was a parody of another prominent councillor at the time.

References 

1892 births
1970 deaths
English Methodists
English people of Irish descent
Independent politicians in England
Mayors of Grantham
Parents of prime ministers of the United Kingdom
English justices of the peace
Workers' Educational Association